EA Black Box (formerly Black Box Games) was a video game developer based in Burnaby, British Columbia, Canada, founded in 1998 by former employees of Radical Entertainment and later acquired by Electronic Arts (EA). The developers are primarily known for the Need for Speed and Skate series. It was renamed Quicklime Games during the development of Need for Speed: World, but after a series of restructures it was shut down in April 2013.

History 

Black Box Games had previously developed  for game publishers such as Sega, Midway Games, and EA. In June 2002, during the development of Need for Speed: Hot Pursuit 2, the firm was acquired by EA and became an entirely owned subsidiary of EA Canada. As a result of the acquisition the studio's name was changed to EA Black Box. In March 2003, the firm lacked space for their current projects and as a solution the top four floors of an office tower in downtown Vancouver were used for expansion. In March 2005, EA Black Box became an independent studio from EA Canada, but still owned by EA.

On December 19, 2008, EA announced that it would be shutting down EA Black Box's Vancouver studio location and relocating operations to EA Canada's Burnaby facilities, as part of EA's worldwide consolidation plans. Officials stressed that EA Black Box would remain open, and said they expected the move to be completed by June 2009. The studio remained a part of the EA Games label, and was independent of the EA Sports studio also located within the Burnaby facility.

In February 2012, EA confirmed a number off lay-offs at EA Canada and EA Black Box, and that they were transforming the studios towards "high-growth digital formats, including online, social gaming and free-to-play". EA declined to comment on whether EA Black Box's brand would remain.

In July 2012, EA Black Box was renamed Quicklime Games during the development of PC game Need for Speed: World, under which name it operated until its closure in April 2013.

Responsibility for the Need for Speed franchise has been taken over by Ghost Games.

The former employees of EA Black Box have spread around other game developers making racing games such as Ubisoft's The Crew and Slightly Mad Studios' World of Speed.

Games developed

References

External links
 

Electronic Arts
Companies based in Burnaby
Video game development companies
Defunct video game companies of Canada
Canadian companies established in 1998
Canadian companies disestablished in 2013
Video game companies established in 1998
Video game companies disestablished in 2013
Defunct companies of British Columbia
Canadian subsidiaries of foreign companies
1998 establishments in British Columbia
2013 disestablishments in British Columbia